Sulphur Township is a former township of Pope County, Arkansas. It was located on the northern edge of the county.

Cities, towns, and villages
 Victor

References

 United States Board on Geographic Names (GNIS)
 United States National Atlas

External links
 US-Counties.com

Townships in Pope County, Arkansas
Townships in Arkansas